Tiantongyuan Station is a subway station on Line 5 of the Beijing Subway.

Station Layout 
The station has 2 elevated side platforms.

Exits 
There are 2 exits, lettered A and B. Exit A is accessible.

Gallery

References

External links
 

Beijing Subway stations in Changping District
Railway stations in China opened in 2007